Roland La Starza (May 12, 1927 – September 30, 2009) was an American boxer and actor.

Life and career
Originally from the Van Nest section of the Bronx, La Starza fought 66 professional bouts from July 7, 1947 to May 8, 1961. He won 57 of the fights, 27 by knockout.

In a March 24, 1950 fight that went against him on a split decision, La Starza may have come closer than any other boxer to defeating Rocky Marciano. The scoring for the bout was 5–4, 4–5, and 5–5, but La Starza lost on a supplemental point system used by New York and Massachusetts at that time. Both boxers were undefeated at the time of the fight, with La Starza's record at 37–0. La Starza went on record in the New York Herald Tribune, March 25, 1950, as saying, "The fact is his manager Al Weill was matchmaker for the Garden. I would say that had a lot to do with the decision." He maintained that belief for over 50 years after the bout.

La Starza later won a heavyweight title eliminator against Rex Layne, setting himself up for what was arguably the most important fight of his career: a world heavyweight championship bout that was a rematch against Marciano on September 24, 1953. The fight took place in an outdoor venue—the Polo Grounds in New York City.  La Starza fought Marciano on even terms for the first six rounds but began to tire afterwards. Referee Ruby Goldstein stopped the fight in an eleventh round.  Marciano had knocked La Starza through the ropes in that round.  La Starza beat Goldstein's count, but the bout was stopped shortly thereafter on a TKO as Marciano battered La Starza relentlessly. This was La Starza's first fight (out of 53) in which he was stopped.

After his boxing career La Starza appeared on television in a number of stereotypical tough-guy roles. His biggest break was a regular role as Pvt. Ernie Lucavich on the short-lived World War II series The Gallant Men. He also did guest appearances on various shows including 77 Sunset Strip, The Wild Wild West and Perry Mason. He appeared in two episodes (13 and 14) of the Batman series of the 1960s, and appeared in movies including Point Blank (1967) and The Outfit (1973).

He, his wife (Jane) and two children (Amy and Mark) left California to retire at their family's cattle ranch outside of New Smyrna Beach, Florida, in 1972.

La Starza died on September 30, 2009, in Port Orange, Florida, at the age of 82.

Professional boxing record

|-
| style="text-align:center;" colspan="8"|57 Wins (27 knockouts), 9 losses (2 knockouts), 0 Draws
|- style="text-align:center; background:#e3e3e3;"
|  style="border-style:none none solid solid; "|Res.
|  style="border-style:none none solid solid; "|Record
|  style="border-style:none none solid solid; "|Opponent
|  style="border-style:none none solid solid; "|Type
|  style="border-style:none none solid solid; "|Round
|  style="border-style:none none solid solid; "|Date
|  style="border-style:none none solid solid; "|Location
|  style="border-style:none none solid solid; "|Notes
|- align=center
|Win 
| 1-0-0
|  Dave Glanton 
| Pts 
| - 
|  
|align=left|Queensboro Arena, Long Island City, Queens, New York, United States
|align=left|
|- align=center
|Win 
| 2-0-0 
|  Zack Johnson 
| KO 
| 6 (6)
|  
|align=left|Jerome Stadium, Bronx, New York, United States
|align=left|
|- align=center
|Win 
| 3-0-0 
|  Al Zappala 
| KO 
| -
|  
|align=left|Jerome Stadium, Bronx, New York, United States
|align=left|
|- align=center
|Win 
| 4-0-0 
|  Jimmy Dodd 
| TKO 
| -
|  
|align=left|Queensboro Arena, Long Island City, Queens, New York, United States
|align=left|
|- align=center
|Win 
| 5-0-0 
|  Jim Johnson 
| KO 
| -
|  
|align=left|Jerome Stadium, Bronx, New York, United States
|align=left|
|- align=center
|Win 
| 6-0-0 
|  Zeke Brown 
| KO 
| -
|  
|align=left|Saint Nicholas Arena, New York, New York, United States
|align=left|
|- align=center
|Win 
| 7-0-0 
|  Matt Mincey 
| PTS 
| -
|  
|align=left|Park Arena, Bronx, New York, United States
|align=left|
|- align=center
|Win 
| 8-0-0 
|  Jimmy Evans 
| PTS 
| -
|  
|align=left|Madison Square Garden, New York, New York, United States
|align=left|
|- align=center
|Win 
| 9-0-0 
|  Lorne McCarthy 
| PTS 
| -
|  
|align=left|Park Arena, Bronx, New York, United States
|align=left|
|- align=center
|Win 
| 10-0-0 
|  Matt Mincey 
| PTS 
| -
|  
|align=left|Saint Nicholas Arena, New York, New York, United States
|align=left|
|- align=center
|Win 
| 11-0-0 
|  Fred Ramsey 
| TKO 
| -
|  
|align=left|Ridgewood Grove, Brooklyn, New York, United States
|align=left|
|- align=center
|Win 
| 12-0-0 
|  Luther McMillan 
| TKO 
| -
|  
|align=left|Park Arena, Bronx, New York, United States
|align=left|
|- align=center
|Win 
| 13-0-0 
|  Mike Belluscio 
| PTS
| -
|  
|align=left|Madison Square Garden, New York, New York, United States
|align=left|
|- align=center
|Win 
| 14-0-0 
|  Frankie Reed 
| TKO
| -
|  
|align=left|Ridgewood Grove, Brooklyn, New York, United States
|align=left|
|- align=center
|Win 
| 15-0-0 
|  Jimmy White 
| KO
| -
|  
|align=left|Park Arena, Bronx, New York, United States
|align=left|
|- align=center
|Win 
| 16-0-0 
|  Steve King 
| PTS
| -
|  
|align=left|Madison Square Garden, New York, New York, United States
|align=left|
|- align=center
|Win 
| 17-0-0 
|  Claude McClintock 
| PTS
| -
|  
|align=left|State Armory, Bridgeport, Connecticut, United States
|align=left|
|- align=center
|Win 
| 18-0-0 
|  John Holloway 
| TKO
| -
|  
|align=left|Ridgewood Grove, Brooklyn, New York, United States
|align=left|
|- align=center
|Win 
| 19-0-0 
|  Freddie McManus 
| PTS
| -
|  
|align=left|Park Arena, Bronx, New York, United States
|align=left|
|- align=center
|Win 
| 20-0-0 
|  Ben Rusk 
| PTS
| -
|  
|align=left|Yankee Stadium, Bronx, New York, United States
|align=left|
|- align=center
|Win 
| 21-0-0 
|  Tony Gangemi 
| PTS
| -
|  
|align=left|Jerome Stadium, Bronx, New York, United States
|align=left|
|- align=center
|Win 
| 22-0-0 
|  Oscar Goode 
| TKO
| -
|  
|align=left|MacArthur Stadium, Brooklyn, New York, United States
|align=left|
|- align=center
|Win 
| 23-0-0 
|  Teddy George 
| KO
| -
|  
|align=left|MacArthur Stadium, Brooklyn, New York, United States
|align=left|
|- align=center
|Win 
| 24-0-0 
|  Mel McKinney 
| KO
| -
|  
|align=left|Queensboro Arena, Long Island City, Queens, New York, United States
|align=left|

|- align=center

Filmography

References

External links
 
 
 TV.com page for Roland La Starza
 Roland La Starza's professional boxing record
 Account of the Marciano–La Starza title fight by Don Sibrel
 Photograph from the Marciano–La Starza title fight

1927 births
2009 deaths
American male actors
American people of Italian descent
Heavyweight boxers
People from the Bronx
People from Port Orange, Florida
American male boxers
Van Nest, Bronx